is a railway station  is a passenger railway station in located in the town of Ōdai, Taki District, Mie Prefecture, Japan, operated by Central Japan Railway Company (JR Tōkai).

Lines

Station layout
The station consists of a single side platform and a single island platform serving three tracks, connected by a footbridge. The wooden station building dates from the station's original construction. The station is unattended.

Platforms

History 
Misedani Station opened on 15 August 1925 as a station on the Japanese Government Railways (JGR) Kisei-East Line. The line was extended on to Takihara Station on 18 August 1926. The JGR became the Japan National Railways (JNR) after World War 2, and the line was renamed the Kisei Main Line on 15 July 1959. The station was absorbed into the JR Central network upon the privatization of the JNR on 1 April 1987. The station has been unattended since 1 April 2012.

Passenger statistics
In fiscal 2019, the station was used by an average of 191 passengers daily (boarding passengers only).

Surrounding area
Miseya Dam
Odai Municipal Miseya Elementary School
Odai Municipal Odai Junior High School
Odai Town Hall

See also
List of railway stations in Japan

References

External links

 JR Central timetable 

Railway stations in Japan opened in 1925
Railway stations in Mie Prefecture
Ōdai